Wout Bastiaens (born 30 March 1994) is a Belgian footballer who currently plays for Wezel Sport in the Belgian Provincial Leagues.

Bastiaens played his first match at the highest level of Belgian football on 18 May 2013 for Oud-Heverlee Leuven, when he was part of the starting lineup in the 4-1 lost match away to Gent.

References

1994 births
Living people
Belgian footballers
Belgian Pro League players
Challenger Pro League players
K.V.C. Westerlo players
Oud-Heverlee Leuven players
K.F.C. Dessel Sport players
Belgium youth international footballers
Association football defenders
Lierse Kempenzonen players